Airwalker is the debut release by Jeremy Jay on K Records. The EP included two covers: '"Lunar Camel" by Siouxsie and the Banshees  and "Angels on the Balcony" by Blondie.

The 7 inch version contains two tracks while the CD version included six songs.

Track listing 
 "Lampost Scene" – 0:40 
 "Airwalker" – 3:35 
 "We Stay Here (In Our Secret World)" – 2:46 
 "Lunar Camel" – 2:11
 "Angels on the Balcony" – 3:10
 "Can We Disappear?" – 3:58

Personnel 
Derek James – bass
Larissa James – photography
Jeremy Jay – synthesizer, guitar, piano, vocals, producer
Ilya Malinsky – guitar
Nick Pahl – drums

References

Jeremy Jay albums
2007 EPs
K Records EPs